Karaurus (meaning head-tail) is an extinct genus of stem-group salamander (Caudata) from the Middle to Late Jurassic (Callovian–Kimmeridgian) Karabastau Formation of Kazakhstan. It is one of the oldest salamanders known.

 
Karaurus is thought to have fed using suction feeding via the enlargement of the buccal cavity on small fish and invertebrates, with the well developed palatal dentition (teeth on the roof of the mouth) and marginal teeth helping to grasp prey. Karaurus is thought to form a clade with Kokartus from the Middle Jurassic (Bathonian) of Kyrgyzstan, and Marmorerpeton from the Bathonian of Britain, together forming the Karauridae, which are closely related to crown salamanders. Like other members of Karauridae, Karaurus is neotenic.

References

Prehistoric salamanders
Late Jurassic amphibians
Prehistoric amphibians of Asia
Prehistoric amphibian genera
Fossil taxa described in 1978